The 1981 World Sambo Championships were held in Madrid, Spain on February/March 1981. Championships were organized by FILA.

Medal overview

External links 
Results on Sambo.net.ua

World Sambo Championships
1981 in sambo (martial art)
1981 in Spanish sport
International sports competitions hosted by Spain
Sports competitions in Madrid